The 1983–84 Rider Broncs men's basketball team represented Rider University in the 1983–84 NCAA Division I men's basketball season. The Broncs, led by ninth-year head coach John Carpenter, played their home games at the Alumni Gymnasium in Lawrenceville, New Jersey as members of the East Coast Conference. They finished the season 20–11, 11–5 in ECC play to finish in second place. In the ECC tournament, they defeated No. 7 seed , No. 3 seed Drexel, and top seed  (in OT) to win the tournament and earn the first bid to the NCAA Tournament in program history. As one of two No. 12 seeds in the East region of the 1984 NCAA tournament, the Broncs were defeated by Richmond, 89–65, in the play-in round.

Roster

Schedule and results 

|-
!colspan=12 style=| Regular season

|-
!colspan=12 style=| MAAC tournament

|-
!colspan=12 style=| NCAA tournament

Sources

References

Rider Broncs men's basketball seasons
Rider Broncs
Rider
Rider Broncs men's basketball
Rider Broncs men's basketball